Kenny Smith is an Irish former rugby union player.

Career
Smith was peculiar for his time in that his was a goal-kicking winger. He was a key member of the Garryowen team, coached by Murray Kidd, that won the All-Ireland League in 1992 and 1994, and he started both of Munster's fixtures in the first Heineken Cup in 1995, though by 1996 he had been replaced in the team by Dominic Crotty.

References

External links
Munster Profile

Living people
Irish rugby union players
Garryowen Football Club players
Munster Rugby players
Rugby union wings
Year of birth missing (living people)